John K. Burgess (circa 1863–1941) was a selectmen and state representative from Dedham, Massachusetts. He lived in the Broad Oak estate. At the time of his death in 1941, he was 78 years old and a retired farmer and engineer.

Burgess was a selectman from 1921 to 1927 and served in the Great and General Court during the same time period. He was a member of the Union Club of Boston and a director of the Dedham Institution for Savings. He was survived by a daughter, Barbara Royce. He was a descendant of Ebenezer Burgess.

Burgess was buried in Old Village Cemetery.

See also
 1925–1926 Massachusetts legislature
 1927–1928 Massachusetts legislature
 1929–1930 Massachusetts legislature
 1931–1932 Massachusetts legislature

References

Dedham, Massachusetts selectmen
Members of the Massachusetts House of Representatives
Burials at Old Village Cemetery
1941 deaths
Year of birth uncertain